Stepanovo is a rural locality (a village) in Pekshinskoye Rural Settlement, Petushinsky District, Vladimir Oblast, Russia. The population was 8 as of 2010.

Geography 
The village is located on the Muliga River, 13 km south-east from Peksha, 28 km south-east from Petushki.

References 

Rural localities in Petushinsky District